The 1973–74 BBC2 Floodlit Trophy was the ninth occasion on which the BBC2 Floodlit Trophy competition had been held.

This year there was another new name on the trophy when 
Bramley won the trophy by beating Widnes by the score of 15-7.

The match was played at Naughton Park, Widnes, Cheshire (but historically in the county of Lancashire). The attendance was 4,542 and receipts were £1538.

Bramley perennial strugglers, had been expected to just make up the numbers against high-flying Widnes, but instead they showed what self-belief, commitment and hard work could do. The result was totally unexpected and is still one of the greatest shocks in Rugby League history. Bramley had joined the Rugby League for the 1896-97 season, the second season in its existence, and in the 77 years since, this was the first trophy the club had ever won. It would also be the only trophy before leaving the league at the end of the 1999 season. This was also the second consecutive season in which Widnes had finished as runners-up in the BBC Floodlit Trophy.

Background 
This was the year in which the Arab-Israeli war created an oil crisis, which together with the miner's work to rule, caused the British Government to ban the use of floodlights in sport on 13 November. This in turn resulted in many of the matches in the Floodlit Trophy, including the final, being played in the afternoon rather than at night.

This season saw three new clubs join the tournament. These were Bramley, Dewsbury and Whitehaven which increased the number of entrants by three, to a new high total of twenty-one.

The format remained the same as the last season with the preliminary round played on a two-legged home and away basis and the rest of the tournament being played on a knock-out basis. The preliminary round now involved ten clubs, to reduce the numbers taking part in the competition proper to just sixteen.

Competition and results

Preliminary round – first leg 
Involved 5 matches and 10 clubs

Competition and results

Preliminary round – second leg 
Involved 5 matches and the same 10 Clubs in reverse fixtures

Round 1 – first round 
Involved  8 matches and 16 clubs

Round 2 – quarter finals 
Involved 4 matches with 8 clubs

Round 3 – semi-finals  
Involved 2 matches and 4 clubs

Final

Teams and scorers 

Scoring - Try = three (3) points - Goal = two (2) points - Drop goal = two (2) points

The road to success 
This tree excludes any preliminary round fixtures

Notes and comments 
1 * The John Player Yearbook 1974–75  gives the attendance as 3,000, but the official St. Helens archives  gives it as 2,000
2 * At the  time this was the highest aggregate score and was never to be beaten
3 * This match was televised
4 * Bramley join the competition and play first game in the competition
5 * The John Player Yearbook 1974–75  gives the attendance as 1,500, but the official St. Helens archives  gives it as 2,108
6 * Whitehaven join the competition and play first game in the competition
7 * Salford, who joined the  competition in season 1966-67, win their first game in the  competition
8 * Dewsbury join the competition and play first game in the competition
9 * Bramley play their first game at home in the competition
a * There appears to be even more confusion about the attendance than normal. The Rothmans Rugby League Yearbook 1990-1991 and 1991-92  gives it 4,422, the RUGBYLEAGUEprojects as 4,542, The John Player Yearbook 1974–75  as 4,000, and the Daily Mirror of 19 December 1973 as 4,500
b * The Winning score and margin were a new record for the final, to date
c * The final was played  in daylight because of restrictions on the use of electricity and floodlights in sport
d * Bramley had joined the Rugby League for the 1896-97 season, the  second season in its existence, and in the 77 years since, this was the first trophy the club had ever won. It would also be the only trophy before leaving the league at the end of the 1999 season
e  * Naughton Park was the home ground of Hull Kingston Rovers from 1895 to 1997, when a new stadium was built on the same site. The final capacity was estimated to be under 10,000 although the record attendance was 24,205 set on 16 February 1961 in a match v St. Helens

General information for those unfamiliar 
The Rugby League BBC2 Floodlit Trophy was a knock-out competition sponsored by the BBC and between rugby league clubs, entrance to which was conditional upon the club having floodlights. Most matches were played on an evening, and those of which the second half was televised, were played on a Tuesday evening.
Despite the competition being named as 'Floodlit', many matches took place during the afternoons and not under floodlights, and several of the entrants, including  Barrow and Bramley did not have adequate lighting. And, when in 1973, due to the world oil crisis, the government restricted the use of floodlights in sport, all the matches, including the Trophy final, had to be played in the afternoon rather than at night.
The Rugby League season always (until the onset of "Summer Rugby" in 1996) ran from around August-time through to around May-time and this competition always took place early in the season, in the Autumn, with the final taking place in December (The only exception to this was when disruption of the fixture list was caused by inclement weather)

See also 
1973–74 Northern Rugby Football League season
1973 Lancashire Cup
1973 Yorkshire Cup
BBC2 Floodlit Trophy
Rugby league county cups

References

External links
Saints Heritage Society
1896–97 Northern Rugby Football Union season at wigan.rlfans.com 
Hull&Proud Fixtures & Results 1896/1897
Widnes Vikings - One team, one passion Season In Review - 1896-97
The Northern Union at warringtonwolves.org
Huddersfield R L Heritage

BBC2 Floodlit Trophy
BBC2 Floodlit Trophy